Richard or Rick Scott may refer to:
Richard Scott (artist) (born 1968), South African artist
Richard Scott (cricketer) (born 1963), English cricketer and cricket coach
Richard Scott (doctor) (1914–1983), Scottish professor of general practice
Richard Scott (footballer) (born 1974), English footballer
Richard Scott (golfer) (born 1983), professional golfer
Richard Scott (ice hockey) (born 1978), Canadian ice hockey player
Richard Scott (settler) (1605–1679), early settler of Providence, Rhode Island
Richard Scott, 10th Duke of Buccleuch (born 1954), British peer and landowner
Richard Scott, Baron Scott of Foscote (born 1934), British life peer and Lord in Appeal of Ordinary
Richard A. Scott (born 1964), comic book artist, writer, videographer and voice actor
Richard Farquhar Scott (1914–2011), Chairman of the Scott Trust, owner of The Guardian
Richard G. Scott (1928–2015), nuclear engineer and member of the Quorum of the Twelve Apostles of the Church of Jesus Christ of Latter-day Saints
Richard Gilbert Scott (1923–2017), architect
Richard H. Scott (1858–1917), Justice of the Wyoming Supreme Court 
Richard J. Scott (born 1938), Canadian jurist
Richard M. Scott (1918–2005), mayor of Lancaster, Pennsylvania
Richard T. Scott (born 1980), American figurative painter
Richard William Scott (1825–1913), Canadian politician and cabinet minister
Rick Scott (born 1952), U.S. Senator from Florida

See also
Dick Scott (disambiguation)

William Richard Scott (born 1932), American sociologist